Dorsey is an unincorporated community located in Itawamba County, Mississippi. A post office operated under the name Dorsey from 1897 to 1971.

References

Unincorporated communities in Itawamba County, Mississippi
Unincorporated communities in Mississippi